Jurong Point (Chinese:裕廊坊) is a large regional shopping mall in the precinct of Jurong West Central in Jurong West, Singapore. It is next to Boon Lay MRT station and Boon Lay Bus Interchange. It is currently the largest shopping mall in Singapore in terms of number of tenants and the largest in western Singapore.

History
Jurong Point first opened its doors in December 1995 with 95 retailers including Courts, Golden Village, NTUC FairPrice, Kopitiam, Old Chang Kee, Harvey Norman and Soo Kee Jewellery. Majority of these retailers were setting up shop in a mall environment for the first time and have not moved out since then. The mall once housed the Jurong West Public Library, which was then the first public library in Singapore to be located in a shopping mall.

Since its opening, the mall has undergone two expansions. In 1998, an additional  of space was successfully secured for the first extension of Jurong Point, which opened in December 2000, adding more than 160 new tenants. This also brought major department store John Little. In 2005, Jurong West Public Library moved out to the adjacent community club and its premises, along with Levels 5 and 6 were reconfigured into a community hub.

In 2006, the mall underwent a major expansion, which included building a new retail wing (JP2), the air conditioned Boon Lay Bus Interchange and a residential development, The Centris. The new wing, containing 230 shops, opened in December 2008. The original mall was subsequently renamed as JP1. This also brought in several new anchor tenants, including an NTUC Fairprice Xtra hypermarket and child-care centre operator My First Skool. The number of parking lots increased three-fold from 415 to 1,425. The Centris was completed in August 2009, followed by the Boon Lay Bus Interchange in December that year.

John Little closed its last suburban store there in July 2016 and was replaced by BHG, which opened in December that year. Operations closed down on 13 February 2022 and replaced by Daiso which includes Threeppy and Standard Products. NTUC FairPrice operations closed down on 21 June 2022 and replaced by Don Don Donki.

Gallery

References

External links
 

Shopping malls in Singapore
Jurong West